Sheldon Glacier is a glacier flowing southeast from Mount Mangin into Ryder Bay, Adelaide Island, Antarctica. Named by the United Kingdom Antarctic Place-Names Committee (UK-APC) in 1977 for Ernest B. Sheldon, British Antarctic Survey (BAS) meteorological observer, Adelaide Station, 1968–69, and Stonington Island, 1969–70; Base Commander, Adelaide Station, 1975–76, and Rothera Station, 1976–77.

Prior to 1977, the glacier was called "Crumbles Glacier".

See also
 List of glaciers in the Antarctic
 Glaciology

References

Glaciers of Adelaide Island